William Brandon Silvers (born May 9, 1994) is an American football quarterback for the Houston Roughnecks of the XFL. He played college football at Troy.

Personal life
Silvers was born to Rae Ann and Jeff Silvers on May 9, 1994 in Pensacola, Florida. His full name is William Brandon Silvers. He has one brother, Chase. His uncle, Carey Christensen, played starting quarterback for the Foley Lions and Troy Trojans, helping the latter to win the 1984 NCAA Division II Football Championship. His aunt, Metta Christensen Stapleton, was a star basketball player for the Foley Lions and South Alabama Jaguars.

High school career
Silvers first started as quarterback his junior year. He threw for 2,468 yards and 26 touchdowns. Silvers had a 54% completion rating his senior year, with 201 attempts for 1,400 yards and 6 touchdowns. He also rushed for 410 yards on 116 carries and nine touchdowns. At the time, ESPN ranked him as the 27th best high school quarterback in the country.

College career
Silvers began playing for the Troy Trojans in 2014, where he set an NCAA record for the highest completion percentage by a freshman.  After 2 losing seasons, Silver led the 2016 Trojans to a 10-3 record and a victory in the Dollar General Bowl over Ohio. For his efforts, he was named First-team All-Sun Belt. 2017 would see Silvers lead the Trojans to another winning record and a Sun Belt Conference co-championship. His final season would be capped off with a victory in the New Orleans Bowl against North Texas. He would declare for the NFL Draft shortly after. In his 4 years at Troy University, Silvers passed for 10,677 yards, 71 touchdowns, and 29 interceptions with a 64.4% completion rating, while also adding 415 rushing yards and 16 touchdowns on 237 attempts. He ended his college career with a passing rating of 135.8. As of 2022, Silvers is second all-time for passing yards and passing touchdowns at Troy.

Collegiate statistics

Professional career
After going undrafted in the 2018 NFL Draft, Silvers was invited to the New Orleans Saints rookie minicamp, but was not signed to a contract.

Memphis Express
He was drafted by the Memphis Express during the 2019 AAF QB Draft. He started the 2019 season as the third-string quarterback behind Christian Hackenberg and Zach Mettenberger. 

Hackenberg was demoted to third string after several weeks of poor play and an injury sidelined Mettenberger in week 6. Silvers then began splitting time with recently signed Johnny Manziel. Silvers and Manziel combined to lead the Express to just its second victory of the season in week 7. Silvers passed for the game-winning touchdown in overtime to beat the Birmingham Iron. With Manziel suffering an injury early in week 8, Silvers played the bulk of the game against the top-ranked Orlando Apollos. Silvers nearly pulled off an upset before losing 34–31, with a late interception by Silvers.

Silvers started two games for the Express, passing for 799 yards, 4 touchdowns, 2 interceptions, and had a 64% completion rating.

New York Jets
On April 10, 2019, Silvers signed with the New York Jets of the NFL. He was waived on May 6, 2019.

Seattle Dragons
On October 15, 2019, Silvers was chosen to be the first QB of the Seattle Dragons of the XFL. He signed a contract with the team on November 4, 2019. He had his contract terminated when the league suspended operations on April 10, 2020.

Silvers signed with the Conquerors of The Spring League in May 2021. In the 2021 season, Silvers would go on to lead the league in passer rating, guiding his team to a 4-2 record. Unfortunately, the Conquerors would fall short of making the championship game. Silvers finished his first season in the Spring League with 685 passing yards, 9 touchdowns, 1 interception, and a passer rating of 127.3.

Silvers signed with the United States Football League after the deadline to be included in the 2022 USFL Draft and was included in the supplemental draft, but went undrafted.

Houston Roughnecks
On September 29, 2022, XFL Reporter Mike Mitchell reported that 8 quarterbacks that worked with Jordan Palmer have reportedly signed with each team. Silvers was signed to the Houston Roughnecks.

Professional statistics

References

1994 births
Living people
People from Orange Beach, Alabama
Players of American football from Alabama
American football quarterbacks
Troy Trojans football players
Memphis Express (American football) players
New York Jets players
Seattle Dragons players
The Spring League players
Houston Roughnecks players